John Ferrant (2 August 1934 – 3 December 2017) was a South African cricketer. He played in 43 first-class matches for Eastern Province from 1956/57 to 1970/71.

See also
 List of Eastern Province representative cricketers

References

External links
 

1934 births
2017 deaths
South African cricketers
Eastern Province cricketers
Cricketers from Port Elizabeth